Irene Curtoni (born 11 August 1985) is an Italian former World Cup alpine ski racer. She was specialised in the technical events of giant slalom and slalom.

Born in Échirolles, Isère, France, where her father was a ski instructor, Curtoni was raised in the province of Sondrio in Lombardy, Italy. Whilst growing up, she also competed in basketball, gymnastics and swimming before settling on skiing. She made her World Cup debut in December 2007, and her best result is a third place in giant slalom in March 2012 in Ofterschwang, Germany. Through December 2020, Curtoni has two World Cup podiums and 32 top ten finishes; she has represented Italy in five World Championships and the 2018 Winter Olympics, where she was tenth in the slalom and part of the Italian squad which finished fifth in the team event.

She won a bronze medal in the team event at the World Championships in 2019.

In 2021 she announced her retirement from the ski competitions. Since 2021 she is working as a technical commentator for women's ski races at the Swiss-Italian television.

Her younger sister is alpine ski racer Elena Curtoni (b.1991).

World Cup results

Season standings

Race podiums

 2 podiums – (1 GS, 1 PS); 32 top tens

World Championship results

Olympic results

References

External links
 
Irene Curtoni at tue Italian Winter Sports Federation (FISI) 

1985 births
Living people
People from Échirolles
Italian female alpine skiers
French sportspeople of Italian descent
Alpine skiers of Gruppo Sportivo Esercito
Alpine skiers at the 2018 Winter Olympics
Olympic alpine skiers of Italy
Sportspeople from the Province of Sondrio
Sportspeople from Isère